The chess championship of El Salvador is organized by the Salvadoran Chess Federation, and was first held in 1946. FIDE Master Boris Pineda has won the title a record eight times. A separate Salvadoran Women's Chess Championship has also been held annually since 1993.

National championship winners
{| class="sortable wikitable"
! Year !! National champion
|-
| 1946 || Antonio Salazar
|-
| 1947 || Antonio González
|-
| 1952 || Juan Serrano
|-
| 1954 || Benjamin Oliva
|-
| 1955 || Juan Serrano
|-
| 1958 || Benjamin Oliva
|-
| 1959 || Donato Pineda
|-
| 1960 || Donato Pineda
|-
| 1961 || Benjamin Oliva
|-
| 1962 || Juan Serrano
|-
| 1963 || Helios Quintanilla
|-
| 1964 || Jaime Soley
|-
| 1965 || Juan Serrano
|-
| 1966 ||Atilio Mojica
|-
| 1967 || Benjamín Rojas
|-
| 1968 || Benjamín Rojas
|-
| 1969 || Atilio Mojica
|-
| 1970 || Leonardo Mena
|-
| 1971 || Antonio Grimaldi
|-
| 1972 ||Atilio Mojica
|-
| 1973 || Antonio Grimaldi
|-
| 1974 || René Grimaldi
|-
| 1975 || Boris Pineda
|-
| 1976 || Boris Pineda
|-
| 1977 || Boris Pineda
|-
| 1978 ||René Grimaldi
|-
| 1979 || Manuel Velásquez
|-
| 1980 || Manuel Velásquez
|-
| 1982 || Salvador Infante
|-
| 1984 || Eduardo Vásquez
|-
| 1985 || Salvador Infante
|-
| 1987 || René Grimaldi
|-
| 1989 ||René Grimaldi
|-
| 1990 || Roberto Camacho
|-
| 1991 ||Boris Pineda
|-
| 1992 || Boris Pineda
|-
| 1994 ||Salvador Infante
|- 
| 1995 || Salvador Infante
|-
| 1996 || Boris Pineda
|-
| 1997 || Roberto Camacho
|- 
| 1998 || Boris Pineda
|-
| 1999 || 
|-
| 2000 || Héctor Leyva
|-
| 2001 || Lemnys Arias
|-
| 2002 || Carlos Burgos
|-
| 2003 ||Boris Pineda
|-
| 2004 ||Carlos Burgos
|-
| 2005 ||Héctor Leyva
|-
| 2006 || Lemnys Arias
|-
| 2007 ||Lemnys Arias
|-
| 2008 || Héctor Leyva
|-
| 2009 || Héctor Leyva
|-
| 2010 ||Héctor Leyva
|-
| 2011 ||Oscar Velásquez
|-
| 2012 || Gustavo Aguilar
|-
| 2013 ||Daniel Arias
|-
| 2014 ||Carlos Burgos
|-
| 2015 ||Carlos Burgos
|- 
| 2016 || Ricardo Chávez
|- 
| 2017 ||Jorge Giron
|- 
| 2018 ||Lemnys Arias
|-
| 2019 ||Lemnys Arias
|- 
| 2020 ||Lemnys Arias
|-
| 2021 || Ricardo Chávez
|}

Women's championship winners
{| class="sortable wikitable"
! Year !! Women's champion
|- 
| 1993 || Reyna Chávez
|-
| 1994 || Brenda Cienfuegos
|- 
| 1995 || Brenda Cienfuegos
|-
| 1996 || Brenda Cienfuegos
|-
| 1997 || Sonia Zepeda
|- 
| 1998 || Sonia Zepeda
|-
| 1999 || Sonia Zepeda
|-
| 2000 || Sonia Zepeda
|-
| 2001 || Lorena Zepeda
|-
| 2002 || Lorena Zepeda
|-
| 2003 || Nayda Avalos
|-
| 2004 || Lorena Zepeda
|-
| 2005 || Lorena Zepeda
|-
| 2006 || Lorena Zepeda
|-
| 2007 || Lorena Zepeda
|-
| 2008 || Ada Castañeda, Gabriela Avelar
|-
| 2009 || Sonia Zepeda, Lorena Zepeda
|-
| 2010 || Marcela Aguilar
|-
| 2011 || Bera Hernandez
|-
| 2012 || Gabriela Avelar
|-
| 2013 || Ingrid Sanchez
|-
| 2014 || Ingrid Sanchez
|-
| 2015 || Ingrid Sanchez
|- 
| 2016 || Marjorie Herrera
|- 
| 2017 || |Judith Santos
|- 
| 2018 || Andrea Ortez
|-
| 2019 || Marjorie Herrera
|- 
| 2020 || Andrea Ortez
|-
| 2021 || Angie Garcia
|}

References

Chess in El Salvador
Chess national championships
Women's chess national championships
Chess championship
Recurring sporting events established in 1946
Recurring sporting events established in 1993
Chess championship
Chess championship
1946 in chess
1993 in chess